The Kinema Junpo Awards for Best Actress is given by Kinema Junpo as part of its annual Kinema Junpo Awards for Japanese films, to recognize a female actor who has delivered an outstanding performance in a leading role.

Winners

External links
Kinema Junpo on IMDb

Japanese film awards